Arachis correntina  (syn. Arachis villosa Benth. var. correntina Burkart) is a herb native to Argentina and Paraguay. This plant is cited as gene sources for research in plant biology of peanut (Arachis hypogaea).

External links
International Legume Database & Information Service: Arachis correntina

correntina
Flora of Argentina
Flora of Paraguay